Henry L. Reese (October 24, 1909 – August 3, 1975) was an American football player.  He played professionally as a center and  guard in the National Football League (NFL) for the New York Giants and the Philadelphia Eagles.  He played college football at Temple University.

References

External links

1909 births
1975 deaths
American football centers
American football guards
New York Giants players
Philadelphia Eagles players
Temple Owls football players
Sportspeople from Scranton, Pennsylvania
Players of American football from Pennsylvania